Alojz Klančnik (born 23 October 1912, date of death unknown) was a Slovenian cross-country skier. He competed at the 1936 Winter Olympics and the 1948 Winter Olympics.

References

1912 births
Year of death missing
Slovenian male cross-country skiers
Olympic cross-country skiers of Yugoslavia
Cross-country skiers at the 1936 Winter Olympics
Cross-country skiers at the 1948 Winter Olympics
People from Kranjska Gora